Huỳnh Văn Thanh (born 20 December 1992) is a Vietnamese footballer who play as a forward for V.League 2 club Khánh Hòa.

International career

International goals

Under-22

Personal honours
  Top goalscorer  V.League 2: 2014

References 

1992 births
Living people
Vietnamese footballers
Association football forwards
V.League 1 players
Thanh Hóa FC players
Binh Dinh FC players
People from Bình Định province
Vietnam international footballers
Footballers at the 2014 Asian Games
Asian Games competitors for Vietnam